Karma: Curse of the 12 Caves  is a 1995 FMV adventure game. In 1998, DreamCatcher Interactive re-released the game as Quest for Karma. The game was released in Japan for PlayStation and Sega Saturn as Takuramakan.

Plot 
In the caves of Dun-Huang, a demon set a trap, so effective that it also trapped the workers who built the trap. It is the player's job to free them.

Gameplay 
The game plays similarly to Myst, another FMV adventure game, except this title has a narrator that guides the player through the narrative and puzzles.

Critical reception 
PC Game praised the game's atmosphere but disliked its illogical puzzles. Just Adventure's Ray Ivey positively compared it to two other Dreamcatcher titles: Jewels of the Oracle and Jewels II: The Ultimate Challenge. Philip Jong of Adventure Classic Gaming wrote that  the game was "released quietly with little fanfare".

References 

1995 video games
Adventure games
Classic Mac OS games
DreamCatcher Interactive games
Full motion video based games
PlayStation (console) games
Sega Saturn games
Video games developed in Taiwan
Windows games